There are a number of listed buildings in Derbyshire. The term "listed building", in the United Kingdom, refers to a building or structure designated as being of special architectural, historical, or cultural significance. Details of all the listed buildings are contained in the National Heritage List for England. They are categorised in three grades: Grade I consists of buildings of outstanding architectural or historical interest, Grade II* includes significant buildings of more than local interest and Grade II consists of buildings of special architectural or historical interest. Buildings in England are listed by the Secretary of State for Culture, Media and Sport on recommendations provided by English Heritage, which also determines the grading.

Some listed buildings are looked after by the National Trust or English Heritage while others are in private ownership or administered by trusts.

Listed buildings by grade
 Grade I listed buildings in Derbyshire
 Grade II* listed buildings in Derbyshire
 Grade II listed buildings in Derbyshire

Listed buildings by civil parish or unparished area

Amber Valley 

 Listed buildings in Aldercar and Langley Mill
 Listed buildings in Alderwasley
 Listed buildings in Alfreton
 Listed buildings in Ashleyhay
 Listed buildings in Belper
 Listed buildings in Codnor
 Listed buildings in Crich
 Listed buildings in Denby
 Listed buildings in Dethick, Lea and Holloway
 Listed buildings in Duffield, Derbyshire
 Listed buildings in Hazelwood, Derbyshire
 Listed buildings in Heanor and Loscoe
 Listed buildings in Holbrook, Derbyshire
 Listed buildings in Horsley, Derbyshire, and Horsley Woodhouse
 Listed buildings in Idridgehay and Alton
 Listed buildings in Ironville
 Listed buildings in Ironville and Riddings Ward
 Listed buildings in Kedleston
 Listed buildings in Kilburn, Derbyshire
 Listed buildings in Kirk Langley
 Listed buildings in Mackworth, Amber Valley
 Listed buildings in Mapperley, Derbyshire
 Listed buildings in Pentrich
 Listed buildings in Quarndon
 Listed buildings in Ripley, Derbyshire
 Listed buildings in Shipley, Derbyshire
 Listed buildings in Shottle and Postern
 Listed buildings in Smalley, Derbyshire
 Listed buildings in South Wingfield
 Listed buildings in Swanwick, Derbyshire
 Listed buildings in Turnditch
 Listed buildings in Weston Underwood, Derbyshire
 Listed buildings in Windley

Bolsover 

 Listed buildings in Ault Hucknall
 Listed buildings in Barlborough
 Listed buildings in Blackwell, Bolsover
 Listed buildings in Clowne
 Listed buildings in Elmton with Creswell
 Listed buildings in Glapwell
 Listed buildings in Langwith, Derbyshire
 Listed buildings in Old Bolsover
 Listed buildings in Pinxton
 Listed buildings in Pleasley
 Listed buildings in Scarcliffe
 Listed buildings in Shirebrook
 Listed buildings in South Normanton
 Listed buildings in Tibshelf
 Listed buildings in Whitwell, Derbyshire

Chesterfield 

 Listed buildings in Brimington
 Listed buildings in Chesterfield, Derbyshire
 Listed buildings in Staveley, Derbyshire

City of Derby 

 Listed buildings in Allestree
 Listed buildings in Alvaston
 Listed buildings in Boulton, Derby
 Listed buildings in Chaddesden
 Listed buildings in Chellaston
 Listed buildings in Darley Abbey
 Listed buildings in Derby (Abbey Ward)
 Listed buildings in Derby (Arboretum Ward)
 Listed buildings in Derby (Blagreaves and Sinfin Wards)
 Listed buildings in Derby (Derwent Ward)
 Listed buildings in Derby (Mackworth Ward)
 Listed buildings in Derby (northern area)
 Listed buildings in Littleover
 Listed buildings in Mickleover
 Listed buildings in Normanton, Derby
 Listed buildings in Spondon

Derbyshire Dales 

 Listed buildings in Aldwark, Derbyshire
 Listed buildings in Alkmonton
 Listed buildings in Ashbourne, Derbyshire
 Listed buildings in Ashford-in-the-Water
 Listed buildings in Atlow
 Listed buildings in Bakewell
 Listed buildings in Ballidon
 Listed buildings in Baslow and Bubnell
 Listed buildings in Beeley
 Listed buildings in Biggin by Hulland
 Listed buildings in Birchover
 Listed buildings in Bonsall, Derbyshire
 Listed buildings in Boylestone
 Listed buildings in Bradbourne
 Listed buildings in Bradley, Derbyshire
 Listed buildings in Bradwell, Derbyshire
 Listed buildings in Brailsford
 Listed buildings in Brassington
 Listed buildings in Callow, Derbyshire
 Listed buildings in Calver
 Listed buildings in Carsington
 Listed buildings in Chatsworth, Derbyshire
 Listed buildings in Chelmorton
 Listed buildings in Clifton and Compton
 Listed buildings in Cromford
 Listed buildings in Cubley, Derbyshire
 Listed buildings in Curbar
 Listed buildings in Darley Dale
 Listed buildings in Doveridge
 Listed buildings in Eaton and Alsop
 Listed buildings in Edensor
 Listed buildings in Edlaston and Wyaston
 Listed buildings in Elton, Derbyshire
 Listed buildings in Eyam
 Listed buildings in Fenny Bentley
 Listed buildings in Flagg, Derbyshire
 Listed buildings in Foolow
 Listed buildings in Froggatt, Derbyshire
 Listed buildings in Gratton, Derbyshire
 Listed buildings in Great Hucklow
 Listed buildings in Great Longstone
 Listed buildings in Grindleford
 Listed buildings in Harthill, Derbyshire
 Listed buildings in Hartington Middle Quarter
 Listed buildings in Hartington Nether Quarter
 Listed buildings in Hartington Town Quarter
 Listed buildings in Hassop
 Listed buildings in Hathersage
 Listed buildings in Hazlebadge
 Listed buildings in Highlow
 Listed buildings in Hognaston
 Listed buildings in Hollington, Derbyshire
 Listed buildings in Hopton, Derbyshire
 Listed buildings in Hulland
 Listed buildings in Hulland Ward
 Listed buildings in Hungry Bentley
 Listed buildings in Kirk Ireton
 Listed buildings in Kniveton
 Listed buildings in Little Longstone
 Listed buildings in Litton, Derbyshire
 Listed buildings in Longford, Derbyshire
 Listed buildings in Mapleton, Derbyshire
 Listed buildings in Marston Montgomery
 Listed buildings in Matlock Bath
 Listed buildings in Matlock Town
 Listed buildings in Melbourne, Derbyshire
 Listed buildings in Mercaston
 Listed buildings in Middleton-by-Wirksworth
 Listed buildings in Middleton and Smerrill
 Listed buildings in Monyash
 Listed buildings in Nether Haddon
 Listed buildings in Newton Grange, Derbyshire
 Listed buildings in Norbury and Roston
 Listed buildings in Offcote and Underwood
 Listed buildings in Offerton, Derbyshire
 Listed buildings in Osmaston, Derbyshire Dales
 Listed buildings in Over Haddon
 Listed buildings in Parwich
 Listed buildings in Rodsley
 Listed buildings in Rowland, Derbyshire
 Listed buildings in Rowsley
 Listed buildings in Sheldon, Derbyshire
 Listed buildings in Shirley, Derbyshire
 Listed buildings in Snelston
 Listed buildings in Somersal Herbert
 Listed buildings in South Darley
 Listed buildings in Stanton, Derbyshire
 Listed buildings in Stoney Middleton
 Listed buildings in Sudbury, Derbyshire
 Listed buildings in Taddington
 Listed buildings in Tansley
 Listed buildings in Thorpe, Derbyshire
 Listed buildings in Tideswell
 Listed buildings in Tissington and Lea Hall
 Listed buildings in Wardlow, Derbyshire
 Listed buildings in Wheston
 Listed buildings in Winster
 Listed buildings in Wirksworth
 Listed buildings in Yeaveley
 Listed buildings in Yeldersley
 Listed buildings in Youlgreave

Erewash 

 Listed buildings in Breadsall
 Listed buildings in Breaston
 Listed buildings in Dale Abbey
 Listed buildings in Draycott and Church Wilne
 Listed buildings in Ilkeston
 Listed buildings in Little Eaton
 Listed buildings in Long Eaton
 Listed buildings in Ockbrook and Borrowash
 Listed buildings in Risley, Derbyshire
 Listed buildings in Sandiacre
 Listed buildings in Sawley, Derbyshire
 Listed buildings in Stanley and Stanley Common
 Listed buildings in Stanton by Dale
 Listed buildings in West Hallam

High Peak 

 Listed buildings in Aston, High Peak
 Listed buildings in Bamford
 Listed buildings in Brough and Shatton
 Listed buildings in Burbage, Derbyshire
 Listed buildings in Buxton
 Listed buildings in Castleton, Derbyshire
 Listed buildings in Chapel-en-le-Frith
 Listed buildings in Charlesworth, Derbyshire
 Listed buildings in Chinley, Buxworth and Brownside
 Listed buildings in Chisworth
 Listed buildings in Derwent, Derbyshire
 Listed buildings in Edale
 Listed buildings in Fairfield, Derbyshire
 Listed buildings in Glossop
 Listed buildings in Green Fairfield
 Listed buildings in Hadfield, Derbyshire
 Listed buildings in Hartington Upper Quarter
 Listed buildings in Hayfield, Derbyshire
 Listed buildings in Hope, Derbyshire
 Listed buildings in Hope Woodlands
 Listed buildings in King Sterndale
 Listed buildings in New Mills
 Listed buildings in Padfield
 Listed buildings in Peak Forest
 Listed buildings in Simmondley
 Listed buildings in Thornhill, Derbyshire
 Listed buildings in Tintwistle
 Listed buildings in Whaley Bridge
 Listed buildings in Whitfield, Derbyshire
 Listed buildings in Wormhill

North East Derbyshire 

 Listed buildings in Ashover
 Listed buildings in Barlow, Derbyshire
 Listed buildings in Brackenfield
 Listed buildings in Brampton, North East Derbyshire
 Listed buildings in Calow
 Listed buildings in Clay Cross
 Listed buildings in Dronfield
 Listed buildings in Eckington, Derbyshire
 Listed buildings in Heath and Holmewood
 Listed buildings in Holmesfield
 Listed buildings in Holymoorside and Walton
 Listed buildings in Killamarsh
 Listed buildings in Morton, Derbyshire
 Listed buildings in North Wingfield
 Listed buildings in Pilsley, North East Derbyshire
 Listed buildings in Shirland and Higham
 Listed buildings in Stretton, Derbyshire
 Listed buildings in Sutton cum Duckmanton
 Listed buildings in Tupton
 Listed buildings in Unstone
 Listed buildings in Wessington
 Listed buildings in Wingerworth

South Derbyshire 

 Listed buildings in Aston-on-Trent
 Listed buildings in Barrow upon Trent
 Listed buildings in Barton Blount
 Listed buildings in Bretby
 Listed buildings in Burnaston
 Listed buildings in Calke
 Listed buildings in Catton, Derbyshire
 Listed buildings in Cauldwell, Derbyshire
 Listed buildings in Church Broughton
 Listed buildings in Coton in the Elms
 Listed buildings in Dalbury Lees
 Listed buildings in Drakelow
 Listed buildings in Egginton
 Listed buildings in Elvaston, Derbyshire
 Listed buildings in Etwall
 Listed buildings in Findern
 Listed buildings in Foremark
 Listed buildings in Foston and Scropton
 Listed buildings in Hartshorne, Derbyshire
 Listed buildings in Hatton, Derbyshire
 Listed buildings in Hilton, Derbyshire
 Listed buildings in Ingleby, Derbyshire
 Listed buildings in Linton, Derbyshire
 Listed buildings in Lullington, Derbyshire
 Listed buildings in Marston on Dove
 Listed buildings in Netherseal
 Listed buildings in Newton Solney
 Listed buildings in Osleston and Thurvaston
 Listed buildings in Overseal
 Listed buildings in Radbourne, Derbyshire
 Listed buildings in Repton
 Listed buildings in Shardlow and Great Wilne
 Listed buildings in Smisby
 Listed buildings in Swadlincote
 Listed buildings in Stanton by Bridge
 Listed buildings in Sutton on the Hill
 Listed buildings in Swarkestone
 Listed buildings in Ticknall
 Listed buildings in Trusley
 Listed buildings in Twyford and Stenson
 Listed buildings in Walton-on-Trent
 Listed buildings in Weston-on-Trent
 Listed buildings in Willington, Derbyshire
 Listed buildings in Woodville, Derbyshire

References

Listed buildings in Derbyshire